Pedro Sánchez (born 22 February 1966) is a Spanish equestrian. He competed at the 1988 Summer Olympics and the 1996 Summer Olympics.

References

1966 births
Living people
Spanish male equestrians
Olympic equestrians of Spain
Equestrians at the 1988 Summer Olympics
Equestrians at the 1996 Summer Olympics
Sportspeople from Murcia